Multnomah Park Cemetery is a 9-acre cemetery located at Southeast 82nd Avenue and Holgate Boulevard, in Portland, Oregon's Foster-Powell neighborhood, in the United States. It was founded in 1888.

Notable burials
 Robert V. Short (1823–1908), an Oregon pioneer and delegate to the Oregon Constitutional Convention

References

External links
 
 
 

Cemeteries in Portland, Oregon
Foster-Powell, Portland, Oregon
Metro (Oregon regional government)